"Shape I'm In" is a pop song written by Joe Camilleri, Jeff Burstin and Tony Faehse and recorded by Australian blues, rock and R&B band Jo Jo Zep & The Falcons. The song was released in October 1979 as the second single from the band's fourth studio album Screaming Targets (1979).

The song peaked at number 22 on the Kent Music Report in Australia.

Track listing 
7" (K 7665) 
Side A1 "Shape I'm In" - 3:32
Side B1 "So Young"  (new version)  - 3:31
Side B2 "Shape I'm In"  (Dub Version)  - 3:01

7" (UK) (WEA – K 79122)
Side A1 "Shape I'm In" - 3:32
Side B1 "Only The Lonely Heart"
Side B1 "Nosey Parker"

Charts

Cover versions
 Elekrik Force covered the song on the album, Craig Obey (2006)
 The Resignators covered the song on the album See You in Hell (2010)

References 

1979 songs
1979 singles
Mushroom Records singles
Songs written by Joe Camilleri
Jo Jo Zep & The Falcons songs